Ellis Carter (born 1995), professionally known as Droideka, is a British record producer and electronic music producer, from Cambridge, England. He is known for his 2013 single "Get Hyper", which ranked high on the charts. After a music career, he has decided music is not for him, having taken a job for ticketing giant Ticketmaster.

Discography

Singles 
 "Ghetto Funk" (2012)
 "Get Hyper" (2013)
 "Human Error" (2013)

References

British electronic musicians
British record producers
1990 births
Living people